Ánimo Venice Charter High School is a public charter school in Venice, Los Angeles which originally opened in 2004. Its mascot is a pirate, and it is operated by Green Dot Public Schools.

History
Due in part to the success of Animo Leadership Charter High School, Ánimo Venice Charter High School was established as the fifth Green Dot school. It opened in August 2002 with 145 students, adding a freshman class of 140 every year until 2006, when it reached its full capacity of approximately 525 students.

Classes began in fall 2004 in a sectioned-off portion of the playground of Broadway Elementary School in Venice. The school moved in 2006 to the former Ninety-Eighth Street Elementary School campus in Los Angeles, which had mostly recently been occupied by Renaissance Academy.

Curriculum
Freshmen are admitted through a lottery process; about 145 applicants to the school are accepted, and the remainder are placed on a waiting list.

References

External links

Ánimo Art
Animo Venice Charter High School on Facebook
Animo Venice Athletics

Charter high schools in California
Educational institutions established in 2004
High schools in Los Angeles
Venice, Los Angeles
Green Dot Public Schools
2004 establishments in California